"Constant Craving" is a song written by Canadian singer-songwriter k.d. lang and Ben Mink, performed by lang and included on her second solo album, Ingénue (1992). The song was released in the United Kingdom in April 1992 and won lang a Grammy Award in the category for Best Female Pop Vocal Performance in 1993, as well as an MTV Video Music Award for Best Female Video.

"Constant Craving" peaked at number eight on Canada's RPM Top Singles chart and number 38 on the US Billboard Hot 100, giving lang her only US top-40 hit to date. It also reached number two on the Billboard Hot Adult Contemporary Tracks chart. In the United Kingdom, the song was a modest hit when released in 1992, but following a reissue in 1993 in the wake of its American success, it reached a new peak of number 15 on the UK Singles Chart.

Song information

English rock band the Rolling Stones used a refrain very similar to that of "Constant Craving" in their 1997 single "Anybody Seen My Baby?." They later gave writing credits on that song to k.d. lang and Mink, shared with the original authors Mick Jagger and Keith Richards.

Critical reception
John T. Davis from Austin American Statesman complimented "Constant Craving" as "a song graced by a compelling melody and a vocal brimming with yearning." Larry Flick from Billboard stated, "There is no denying the rootsy, down-home quality of this wonderfully produced tune. Lang's distinctive voice is woven into spiraling multitracked harmonies, wafting over a base of acoustic guitar strumming and subtle  and xylophone interludes." Steve Morse from Boston Globe named it the best song of the album, declaring it as "a romantic number that's also the only rhythmic tune of the bunch." Clark and DeVaney from Cash Box named it Pick of the Week and a "standout" of the album. A reviewer from Daily Mirror described it as "haunting". Rufer and Fell from the Gavin Report commented, "k.d.'s foresaken country for a straight pop format that will finally win her the mass audience she's deserved. This track showcases her wonderful voice in solo and multi-part harmonies." 

Pan-European magazine Music & Media described it as "a Brecht/Weil on the prairie type of song—is likely to be lang's first hit in the UK and in Ireland". On the album review, an editor wrote, "Tales from the new west. La lang has changed her position on horseback for a more comfortable seat on the coach. In mind, she's singing in some Paris café in the decadent '20s." John Milward from Rolling Stone felt the song is "more elusive", "but there's no denying the lift of its propulsive rhythms and joyful harmonies." David Bauder from The Salt Lake Tribune praised "Constant Craving" as one of lang's best songs, remarking that it "concludes that a sense of longing is an inevitable part of life."

Retrospective response
Mark Deming from AllMusic felt that the "emotional core" of songs like "Constant Craving", "was obvious even when their surfaces were evasive." In 2019, Billboard included it in its list of the "30 Lesbian Love Songs". In 2008, the Daily Vault's Jason Warburg viewed it as a "dynamite single", that "manages to meld the spiritual with the physical while conveying a feverish desire for both kinds of fulfillment." He also remarked its "upbeat", "expansive and full of simmering appeal".

Music video
The accompanying music video for the song was filmed in black-and-white. It presents a fanciful recreation of the premiere of Samuel Beckett's play Waiting for Godot in Paris, 1953. Here, she is depicted singing backstage while the actors perform. The director, Mark Romanek, says the song's lyrics of desperation and waiting fit well with the themes of Beckett's play. VH1 added the video to its playlist in mid-April 1992. The clip won Best Female Video at the 1993 MTV Video Music Awards.

Track listings

1992 release

 US 7-inch and cassette single
A. "Constant Craving" (album version) – 4:38
B. "Season of Hollow Soul" (album version) – 4:56

 UK 12-inch and CD single
 "Constant Craving" (edit)
 "Barefoot" (rhythmic version)
 "Season of Hollow Soul"

 UK 7-inch and cassette single
 "Constant Craving" (edit)
 "Barefoot" (rhythmic version)

 European CD single
 "Constant Craving" (radio edit) – 3:45
 "Constant Craving" (album version) – 4:38
 "Tears of Love's Recall" – 3:48

1993 release

 UK 7-inch and cassette single
 "Constant Craving" (edit) – 3:45
 "Miss Chatelaine" (live) – 4:28

 UK CD1 and Australian CD single
 "Constant Craving" (edit) – 3:45
 "Wash Me Clean" (live) – 3:28
 "The Mind of Love" (live) – 3:17

 UK CD2
 "Constant Craving" (live) – 4:18
 "Miss Chatelaine" (live) – 4:28
 "Big Boned Gal" (live) – 3:47
 "Outside Myself" (live) – 5:03

Charts

Weekly charts

Year-end charts

Release history

Cover versions

 Abigail covered the song on her 1994 album, Feel Good.
 Montreal based electropunk band Lesbians on Ecstasy reworked the song as "Kündstant Krøving" on their 2004 album Lesbians on Ecstasy.
 Charlotte Martin has also recorded a cover of the song on her album Reproductions.
 In 2011, the song was featured in the Glee episode "I Kissed a Girl" with vocals by Naya Rivera, Idina Menzel and Chris Colfer.

Track listings (Abigail version)
 12-inch vinyl single (Klone Records – 1993)
 "Constant Craving" (Vocal Version)
 "Constant Craving" (Instrumental)
 "Don't Tell Me Why" (Vocal Version)
 "Don't Tell Me Why" (Instrumental)

 CD maxi-single (Klone Records – 1993)
 "Constant Craving" (Radio Version) – 4:06
 "Constant Craving" (Original Mix) – 6:24
 "Constant Craving" (Trade Mix) – 9:34
 "Don't Tell Me Why" – 4:50

 12-inch vinyl single (ZYX Music – 1995)
(title was changed to Constant Craving '95)
 "Constant Craving '95" (Illusive Mix) – 8:01
 "Constant Craving '95" (Gailforce Mix) – 8:01
 "Constant Craving '95" (Original Mix)
 "What Goes Around Comes Around" (Ace Mix) – 6:03

 CD maxi-single (ZYX Music – 1995)
 "Constant Craving '95" (Radio Edit) – 4:04
 "Constant Craving '95" (Illusive Mix) – 8:01
 "Constant Craving '95" (Gailforce Mix) – 8:01
 "What Goes Around Comes Around" (Ace Mix) – 6:03

References

1992 singles
1992 songs
1993 singles
1995 singles
Abigail (singer) songs
Black-and-white music videos
Grammy Award for Best Female Pop Vocal Performance
K.d. lang songs
MTV Video Music Award for Best Female Video
Music videos directed by Mark Romanek
Sire Records singles
Songs written by Ben Mink
Songs written by k.d. lang
Warner Records singles
ZYX Music singles